Undrafted is the debut studio album by National Basketball Association (NBA) player, Troy Hudson under his nickname, T-Hud. It featured guests such as Ray J, Three 6 Mafia, and UGK. The album's title alludes to his being undrafted by the NBA coming out of college.

Track listing
Intro – 1:22 
"Real Shit" – 3:49 
"True Love" feat. Ray J – 4:33 
"So Here" – 3:16 
"I'm a Gangsta" feat. Three 6 Mafia – 4:24 
"Go Getta" – 4:06 
"Everyday All Day" – 4:34 
"White 550's" – 3:19 
"Good Weather Music (Never Thought)" feat. Static Major & UGK – 4:06  
"Back to the Block" feat. Mo-Unique – 5:17 
"Rich as a Bitch" – 3:13 
"Good Life" feat. Darius Harrison – 3:56 
"The Hoods Only" – 4:20 
"Pussy Whipped" feat. Mo-Unique – 4:39 
"No No No" – 3:38 
"How I Get By" feat. TQ – 3:43 
"Roll with Me" – 3:59 
"Chief of the Midwest" – 8:28

References

2007 debut albums